Patellapis sigiriella is a species of bee in the genus Patellapis, of the family Halictidae. It is endemic to Sri Lanka, specimen was first found from Sigiriya area of Matale District.

External links
  Atlashymenoptera.net
 Beesind.com
 Academia.edu
 Atlashymenoptera.net

Halictidae
Insects described in 1911